Aaron Geramipoor (born 11 September 1992) is a British-Iranian professional basketball player. He represents the Iran national team. Born and raised in Stockport, Manchester. 

Official 2019 FIBA Basketball World Cup, stated that “ The 7-footer added another big body to relieve pressure off Hamed Haddadi and even put up productive and efficient numbers of his own. In 16.7 minutes per game, Geramipoor averaged 10.4 points and 6.0 rebounds on 69.7 percent shooting.

Soon after the 2019 FIBA World Cup, Geramipoor then travelled to Taipei, Taiwan to play for Jeou Tai in the SBL 
Geramipoor averaged 19.5ppg, 9.5rpg, 4.2 apg, 1.8 bpg, 1.0 spg.

In January 2020, it was announced that Geramipoor had signed for the Argentine side San Lorenzo de Almagro.

A few weeks later, the team travelled to Tenerife for the Intercontinental Cup 2020, where the team also banked 3rd place.

On March 18, 2022, he signed with the Taichung Wagor Suns of the T1 League. On September 9, Geramipoor re-signed with the Taichung Wagor Suns. On March 8, 2023, Taichung Suns cancelled the registration of Geramipoor's playership due to the injury.

References

External links
 https://www.tasnimnews.com/en/news/2019/11/17/2142049/it-s-honor-to-represent-iran-basketball-team-aaron-geramipoor/amp
 http://www.fiba.basketball/asiacup/2021/qualifiers/news/well-travelled-aaron-geramipoor-aims-to-build-on-world-cup-debut-with-iran

1992 births
Living people
Basketball players at the 2020 Summer Olympics
British expatriate basketball people in Argentina
British expatriate basketball people in Mexico
British expatriate basketball people in Spain
British expatriate basketball people in the United States
British people of Iranian descent
British men's basketball players
CB Breogán players
CB Canarias players
Centers (basketball)
Club Ourense Baloncesto players
Iranian men's basketball players
Jeoutai Technology basketball players
KK Cibona players
Olympic basketball players of Iran
Seton Hall University alumni
Seton Hall Pirates men's basketball players
Soles de Mexicali players
Sportspeople from Stockport
Sportspeople of Iranian descent
2019 FIBA Basketball World Cup players
Taichung Wagor Suns players
T1 League imports
Taichung Suns players
T1 League All-Stars